Vitisin A is a natural phenol found in red wines. It is a pyranoanthocyanin.

See also 
 Phenolic compounds in wine
 Vitisin B (pyranoanthocyanin)

References

External links 
 Vitisin A on www.phenol-explorer.eu

Pyranoanthocyanins